Scrobipalpa algeriensis is a moth in the family Gelechiidae. It was described by Povolný and Bradley in 1965. It is found in Morocco, Algeria, Tunisia and Spain.

References

Scrobipalpa
Moths described in 1965